Claim Jumper is a video game written by Gray Chang for the Atari 8-bit family and published by Synapse Software in 1982. It is primarily designed as a two-player competitive game, but includes a separate shoot 'em up mode for either one or two players.

Gameplay
Claim Jumper is a game in which the player is a cowboy collecting gold bars.

Development
Gray Chang previously wrote the two-player competitive game Dog Daze for the Atari Program Exchange. After Claim Jumper he designed two more games for two simultaneous players: Dog Daze Deluxe and Bumpomov's Dogs.

Chang kept a notebook while writing Claim Jumper which contains nearly 200 pages of code, flowcharts, technical details, and graph paper sketches of the game art.

Reception
Allen Doum reviewed the game for Computer Gaming World, and stated that "The graphics and animation in Claim Jumper are very good but, while there are sound cues for most game actions, the sounds are not very imaginative. There aren't many interactively competitive two player arcade-style games, so it is nice to see a company like Synapse release a game like Claim Jumper which fills that need so nicely."

References

External links
Review in Compute!
Addison Wesley Book of Atari Software 1984
Review in Creative Computing
Review in Computer and Video Games
Review in TeleMatch

1982 video games
Atari 8-bit family games
Atari 8-bit family-only games
Multiplayer video games
Synapse Software games
Video games developed in the United States
Western (genre) video games